Circulez y'a rien à voir is a 1983 French comedy film directed by Patrice Leconte.

Plot 
Hélène Duvernet (Jane Birkin), owner of an art gallery, is questioned by the inspectors Pelissier (Jacques Villeret) and Leroux (Michel Blanc) for a routine affair. But Leroux suddenly has a passion for Hélène, and starts finding any pretext to talk to her or keep an eye on her. He enters her house several times unexpectedly, takes her spinning, and even steels her car so she must pass by the police office. Ironically, Hélène seems to have something to reproach herself, because she does art traffic with her lover Marc. When she leaves for Geneva to sell paintings of Amedeo Modigliani hidden under a paint coating to let think that they are contemporary paintings, she defies Leroux to follow her flight by car, what he does. He finally discovers the truth once arrived in Switzerland, becomes angry at Hélène and suddenly has a pain. While Hélène gives her a cold shower, he kisses her by surprise.

Feeling troubled, he goes back to Paris, but both end by seeing each other at Hélène's house. They discover Marc taking a bath drying his hair. Hélène announces him that Leroux is there and has discovered their traffic. Marc is surprised and is electrocuted in his bathtub with his hairdryer. Hélène and Leaux work as a team to hide Marc's body. They finally throw it from the top a bridge, but it finally falls on a houseboat. Hélène flies alone to Brasil, estimating that she is the only one related to Marc's death. But Leroux realises that a part of his eternal raincoat has been torn and stayed on the corpse of Marc.

Cast 
 Michel Blanc as Inspecteur Leroux
 Jane Birkin as Hélène Duvernet
 Jacques Villeret as Inspecteur Pelissier
 Michel Robbe as Marc
 Gaëlle Legrand as Martine, girlfriend of Leroux
 Martin Lamotte as the joking chef
 Dominique Faysse as the housewife
 Luis Rego as Reska
 Alan Adair as Müller
 Wilfrid Durry as the station master
 Marc Adjadj as the hairdresser
 Mathieu Chardet as the customs agent at the Swiss border
 Jean-Paul Lilienfeld as the policeman on the bridge
 Jean-Marc Roulot as the CRS at Roissy Charles de Gaulle Airport
 Jean-Michel Ribes as the bar owner

External links 

1983 films
1983 comedy films
French comedy films
Films directed by Patrice Leconte
1980s French films
1980s French-language films